Senator Clayton may refer to:

Members of the United States Senate
John M. Clayton (1796–1856), U.S. Senator from Delaware from 1829 to 1836, from 1845 to 1849, and from 1853 to 1856
Joshua Clayton (1744–1798), U.S. Senator from Delaware in 1798
Powell Clayton (1833–1914), U.S. Senator from Arkansas from 1871 to 1877
Thomas Clayton (1777–1854), U.S. Senator from Delaware from 1824 to 1827 and from 1837 to 1847

United States state senate members
Augustin Smith Clayton (1783–1839), Georgia State Senate
John M. Clayton (Arkansas politician) (1840–1889), Arkansas State Senate
William C. Clayton (1831–1915), West Virginia State Senate